The 2020–21 Biathlon World Cup – Pursuit Men started on 5 December 2020 in Kontiolahti and will finished on 20 March 2021 in Östersund

Competition format
The  pursuit race is skied over five laps. The biathlete shoots four times at any shooting lane, in the order of prone, prone, standing, standing, totalling 20 targets. For each missed target a biathlete has to run a  penalty loop. Competitors' starts are staggered, according to the result of the previous sprint race.

2019–20 Top 3 standings

Medal winners

Standings
6 of 8 competitions scored

References

Pursuit Men